TV Pictoris is a rotating ellipsoidal variable star in the constellation Pictor. It ranges between apparent magnitude 7.37 - 7.53 over a period of 0.85 days. It was first discovered to be variable in 1987. The system is inclined at an angle of 54 degrees to observers on Earth. It is composed of a primary star that has a radius 4.3 times that of the sun and 1.2 times its mass, and an effective (surface) temperature of 8300 K, and a secondary star with a radius 2.1 times that of the sun and 40% of its mass, and an effective temperature of 7000 K. Both stars are less massive than expected for a main sequence star of their temperatures. The secondary rotates much faster than the primary.

The system shines with a combined spectrum of A2V.

References 

Pictoris, TV
Pictor (constellation)
A-type main-sequence stars
Rotating ellipsoidal variables
Durchmusterung objects
030861
022370